John Miceli (born May 29, 1961 in Long Island, New York) is the drummer for Meat Loaf's backing band, the Neverland Express.

Meat Loaf
Miceli began touring with Meat Loaf in 1991, and was a part of the Neverland Express when Bat Out of Hell II: Back into Hell took off, launching a major industry comeback for Meat Loaf. He has appeared on drums on all of Loaf's subsequent studio albums (Welcome to the Neighbourhood [one track], Couldn't Have Said It Better [three tracks], Bat Out of Hell III: The Monster Is Loose [two tracks], Hang Cool Teddy Bear, Hell in a Handbasket, and Braver Than We Are [the entirety of each]), which has led to appearances on greatest hits compilations such as The Very Best of Meat Loaf, and live albums including Live Around the World, VH1 Storytellers, Night of the Proms and Bat Out of Hell: Live with the MSO.

Other touring and recording credits
In addition to his work with Meat Loaf, Miceli has recorded with Adam Lambert (For Your Entertainment, "Time for Miracles"), Foxy Shazam ("Count Me Out"), Nine Days, Marchello/The Good Rats (with whom he toured under the former name), and Kerry Ellis (Anthems). Most recently, Miceli did most of the drum work on the My Chemical Romance release Danger Days: The True Lives of the Fabulous Killjoys.

He has also toured with Blue Öyster Cult and Ritchie Blackmore's Rainbow (1997 U.S. tour). He also appeared in the live band for the Las Vegas run of the Queen musical We Will Rock You.

In December 2018 he was credited as the drummer on Brian May's single, "New Horizons", which the Queen guitarist composed as a personal tribute to the on-going NASA's New Horizons mission.

References

External links
Official website
Debs Meaty World
My Chemical Romance Forum: Interview with guitarist Ray Toro

American rock drummers
Living people
1961 births
People from Long Island
Rainbow (rock band) members
Neverland Express members
20th-century American drummers
American male drummers
American people of Italian descent
American heavy metal drummers